The Array of Jewels is one of the Seventeen tantras of Dzogchen Upadesha.

Primary resources
nor bu phra bkod rang gi don thams cad gsal bar byed pa'i rgyud @ Wikisource in Wylie
ནོར་བུ་ཕྲ་བཀོད་རང་གི་དོན་ཐམས་ཅད་གསལ་བར་བྱེད་པའི་རྒྱུད @ Wikisource in Uchen (Tibetan Script), Unicode

Notes

Dzogchen texts
Nyingma tantras